The 1926–27 Divisione Nazionale season was won by Torino on the field, however the title was revoked during the following season due to alleged match fixing in a derby match against Juventus. This was the first Italian championship organized on a national basis.

The Viareggio Charter
In 1926 the ”Viareggio Charter” submitted the Italian football's organization to the fascist regime. The Northern League was disbanded and it was substituted by the Higher Divisions Directory, an authority appointed by the fascists. Three clubs from Southern Italy were added to the original sixteen-clubs championship to make it a national league. The 20th club had been chosen by a special qualification between the relegated clubs of the Northern League which was won by US Alessandria.
 
A final phase substituted the championship final which had become a traditional appointment with riots and supporter violences.

First phase

Group A

Classification

Results table
 The home teams are read down the left hand side while the away teams are indicated along the top.

Group B

Classification

Results table
 The home teams are read down the left hand side while the away teams are indicated along the top.

Final round

Classification

Results table

Top goalscorers

References and sources
Almanacco Illustrato del Calcio - La Storia 1898-2004, Panini Edizioni, Modena, September 2005

Footnotes

Serie A seasons
Italy
1926–27 in Italian football leagues